The following lists show the radio broadcasting stations that transmit from the mexican state of Puebla in the bands of AM (amplitude modulation) and FM (frequency modulation), registered with the Federal Telecommunications Institute.

Acatlán de Osorio

Atlixco

Chignahuapan

Ciudad Serdán

Frequency modulation

Cuetzalan

Amplitude modulation

Puebla de Zaragoza

Amplitude modulation

Frequency modulation

Huauchinango

Frequency modulation

Izúcar de Matamoros

Amplitude modulation

Frequency modulation

Palmar de Bravo

San Martín Texmelucan

Frequency modulation

Tehuacán

Amplitude modulation

Frequency modulation

Teziutlán

Frequency modulation

Xicotepec de Juárez

Amplitude modulation

Frecuency modulation

Zacatlán

Defunct formats

Puebla, Puebla 

Amplitude modulation

Frequency modulation

References 

Puebla
Radio stations in Puebla